Michael D. Dubie (born March 25, 1960) is a United States Air Force officer who attained the rank of lieutenant general while serving as the deputy commander of United States Northern Command from 2012 to 2015. From 2006 to 2012 he was Adjutant General of the State of Vermont, serving as the senior uniformed officer in the state responsible for the organization, training and equipage of the 4,000 members of the Vermont Army and Air National Guard.  As adjutant general, he also served as inspector general, quartermaster general and head of the State Military Department, including Veterans Affairs.

Early life
Michael David Dubie was born in Burlington, Vermont, on March 25, 1960. He is a 1978 graduate of Essex High School in Essex Junction, Vermont. Dubie graduated from the University of Vermont in 1982 with a bachelor’s degree in economics.

Military career
Dubie began his military career in 1979 at the University of Vermont's ROTC program and simultaneously joined the 150th Aviation Battalion in the Vermont Army National Guard. He was commissioned as a second lieutenant in 1981 and later transferred to the Vermont Air National Guard.

Dubie held a variety of command, supervisory and staff positions at the 158th Fighter Wing and Vermont State Headquarters and served as the assistant adjutant general responsible for the Vermont Joint Staff and Joint Force Headquarters. Additionally, Dubie commanded the 447th Air Expeditionary Group at the Baghdad International Airport and served as director of staff for the 332nd Air Expeditionary Wing, Balad Air Base, Iraq. Dubie is a command pilot with over 2,000 hours of military flying, the majority in the F-16.

Dubie became adjutant general in 2006, winning the legislative election to succeed Martha Rainville, who retired to run for the United States House of Representatives.  Dubie won election to a full term in 2007, and was reelected in 2009 and 2011.  (In Vermont, the adjutant general is elected for a two-year term by a secret ballot of the Vermont General Assembly.)

In 2010 Dubie became president of the Adjutants General Association of the United States.

Also in 2011 Dubie oversaw the Vermont National Guard's participation in the recovery following Hurricane Irene. This effort included providing emergency food and water, aiding individuals flooded out of their homes to move to temporary shelter, and assisting in debris removal and reconstructing roads and bridges.

In May 2012 Dubie was nominated to succeed Frank J. Grass as deputy commander of the United States Northern Command and recommended for promotion to lieutenant general.  Later that month his promotion and appointment were confirmed by the United States Senate.

Dubie turned command of the Vermont National Guard over to Brigadier General Thomas E. Drew on August 3, 2012. Drew had previously served as deputy adjutant general.

Dubie was formally promoted to lieutenant general in a ceremony on August 14, 2012.  His stars were pinned on by his wife and Lieutenant General Harry Wyatt, the director of the Air National Guard.

In July 2015 Dubie completed his assignment at NORTHCOM and returned to Vermont, where he performed administrative duties and out processing in anticipation of retiring in September.  Major General Daniel R. Hokanson, the Adjutant General of Oregon, was announced as Dubie's successor at NORTHCOM.

Dubie retired in a ceremony held on October 2, 2015. At his retirement, Dubie received the Defense Distinguished Service Medal, which was presented by Senator Patrick Leahy.

Civilian career
Prior to serving as adjutant general, Dubie was a pilot for Northwest Airlines. During his civilian career he flew the Boeing 727, Airbus 320, McDonnell Douglas DC-10, and Boeing 747-400.

In November 2015, Dubie joined Revision Military, a Vermont-based maker of military eyewear and other tactical gear, as head of the company's technology subsidiary, which conducts research and development of advanced manufacturing materials for use in protective equipment.

Personal life
Dubie's brother Brian Dubie is the former Lieutenant Governor of Vermont and a retired colonel in the United States Air Force Reserve.

In 2011 Dubie received an honorary doctorate from the University of Vermont. In 2012 St. Michael's College also presented him with an honorary doctorate.

Education
 1982 Bachelor of Arts, Economics, University of Vermont, Burlington, Vermont
 1995 Air Command and Staff College, correspondence program
 1998 Air War College, in-residence program, (Award Recipient) Maxwell Air Force Base, Alabama
 1999 Master of Arts Degree, International Relations, Norwich University, Northfield, Vermont
 2003 Senior Executives in National and International Security, John F. Kennedy School of Government, Harvard University, Cambridge, Massachusetts

Awards and decorations

References

External resources

Michael D. Dubie at United States Air Force Senior Leader Biographies

1960 births
Living people
People from Burlington, Vermont
National Guard (United States) generals
United States Air Force personnel of the Iraq War
University of Vermont alumni
Norwich University alumni
Harvard Kennedy School alumni
Air Command and Staff College alumni
Air War College alumni
United States Air Force generals
Recipients of the Legion of Merit
Recipients of the Air Force Distinguished Service Medal
Commercial aviators
Vermont National Guard personnel
Recipients of the Defense Distinguished Service Medal